is a railway station on the Iida Line in Tenryū-ku, Hamamatsu, Shizuoka Prefecture, Japan, operated by Central Japan Railway Company (JR Central).

Lines
Shimokawai Station is served by the Iida Line and is 59.9 kilometers from the starting point of the line at Toyohashi Station.

Station layout
The station has one ground-level side platform serving a single bi-directional track, with a small waiting room built onto the platform. It formerly had a single island platform, but was rebuilt in 2008. The station is unattended.

Adjacent stations

Station history
Shimokawai Station was established on November 11, 1934. On August 1, 1943, the Sanshin Railway was nationalized along with several other local lines to form the Iida line. 
All freight services were discontinued in 1971. Along with its division and privatization of JNR on April 1, 1987, the station came under the control and operation of the Central Japan Railway Company.

Passenger statistics
In fiscal 2016, the station was used by an average of 15 passengers daily (boarding passengers only).

Surrounding area

See also
 List of railway stations in Japan

References

External links

  Iida Line station information

Stations of Central Japan Railway Company
Iida Line
Railway stations in Japan opened in 1934
Railway stations in Shizuoka Prefecture
Railway stations in Hamamatsu